TS Class 3 was a series of ten trams built by Hannoversche Waggonfabrik (HaWa) for Trondheim Sporvei. They were delivered in November 1922, and put into service on 4 and 22 December. They remained in service until 1962.

They had a single compartment, with outdoor platforms at each end. They remained in service until 1951, but after the Dalsenget fire the following year, ten of the trams were taken back into use until the Class 7 trams were delivered in 1958. Most of the trams were scrapped in 1961 and 1962, though two were rebuilt to working vehicles. Two unit are still preserved at Trondheim Tramway Museum.

Along with the trams, twelve trailers were delivered, numbered 64–75. They remained in service until 10 October 1956, when they burnt down in the Dalsenget fire. One trailer survived the fire, and has been preserved.

References

Trondheim Tramway stock

600 V DC multiple units
Multiple units of Norway